In geometry, the triangular tiling or triangular tessellation is one of the three regular tilings of the Euclidean plane, and is the only such tiling where the constituent shapes are not parallelogons. Because the internal angle of the equilateral triangle is 60 degrees, six triangles at a point occupy a full 360 degrees. The triangular tiling has Schläfli symbol of 

English mathematician John Conway called it a deltille, named from the triangular shape of the Greek letter delta (Δ). The triangular tiling can also be called a kishextille by a kis operation that adds a center point and triangles to replace the faces of a hextille.

It is one of three regular tilings of the plane. The other two are the square tiling and the hexagonal tiling.

Uniform colorings 

There are 9 distinct uniform colorings of a triangular tiling. (Naming the colors by indices on the 6 triangles around a vertex: 111111, 111112, 111212, 111213, 111222, 112122, 121212, 121213, 121314) Three of them can be derived from others by repeating colors: 111212 and 111112 from 121213 by combining 1 and 3, while 111213 is reduced from 121314.

There is one class of Archimedean colorings, 111112, (marked with a *) which is not 1-uniform, containing alternate rows of triangles where every third is colored. The example shown is 2-uniform, but there are infinitely many such Archimedean colorings that can be created by arbitrary horizontal shifts of the rows.

A2 lattice and circle packings 

The vertex arrangement of the triangular tiling is called an A2 lattice. It is the 2-dimensional case of a simplectic honeycomb.

The A lattice (also called A) can be constructed by the union of all three A2 lattices, and equivalent to the A2 lattice.
 +  +  = dual of  = 

The vertices of the triangular tiling are the centers of the densest possible circle packing. Every circle is in contact with 6 other circles in the packing (kissing number).
The voronoi cell of a triangular tiling is a hexagon, and so the voronoi tessellation, the hexagonal tiling, has a direct correspondence to the circle packings.

Geometric variations  

Triangular tilings can be made with the equivalent {3,6} topology as the regular tiling (6 triangles around every vertex). With identical faces (face-transitivity) and vertex-transitivity, there are 5 variations. Symmetry given assumes all faces are the same color.

Related polyhedra and tilings 

The planar tilings are related to polyhedra. Putting fewer triangles on a vertex leaves a gap and allows it to be folded into a pyramid. These can be expanded to Platonic solids: five, four and three triangles on a vertex define an icosahedron, octahedron, and tetrahedron respectively.

This tiling is topologically related as a part of sequence of regular polyhedra with Schläfli symbols {3,n}, continuing into the hyperbolic plane.

It is also topologically related as a part of sequence of Catalan solids with face configuration Vn.6.6, and also continuing into the hyperbolic plane.

Wythoff constructions from hexagonal and triangular tilings 

Like the uniform polyhedra there are eight uniform tilings that can be based from the regular hexagonal tiling (or the dual triangular tiling).

Drawing the tiles colored as red on the original faces, yellow at the original vertices, and blue along the original edges, there are 8 forms, 7 which are topologically distinct. (The truncated triangular tiling is topologically identical to the hexagonal tiling.)

Related regular complex apeirogons 

There are 4 regular complex apeirogons, sharing the vertices of the triangular tiling. Regular complex apeirogons have vertices and edges, where edges can contain 2 or more vertices. Regular apeirogons p{q}r are constrained by: 1/p + 2/q + 1/r = 1. Edges have p vertices, and vertex figures are r-gonal.

The first is made of 2-edges, and next two are triangular edges, and the last has overlapping hexagonal edges.

Other triangular tilings
There are also three Laves tilings made of single type of triangles:

See also

 Triangular tiling honeycomb
 Simplectic honeycomb
 Tilings of regular polygons
 List of uniform tilings
 Isogrid (structural design using triangular tiling)

References 

 Coxeter, H.S.M. Regular Polytopes, (3rd edition, 1973), Dover edition,  p. 296, Table II: Regular honeycombs
  (Chapter 2.1: Regular and uniform tilings, p. 58-65, Chapter 2.9 Archimedean and Uniform colorings pp. 102–107)
  p35
 John H. Conway, Heidi Burgiel, Chaim Goodman-Strass, The Symmetries of Things 2008,

External links 
 
 
 
 

Euclidean tilings
Isogonal tilings
Isohedral tilings
Regular tilings
 
Regular tessellations